Palopa is a term used in Papua New Guinea and the diaspora as a non-heteronormative term for people may identify in Western nomenclature as either gay, transsexual or having a third gender role. LGBTQ+ activist Clint Woolly has described how Western terminology is stigmatised by many in Papua New Guinea, and that indigenous descriptors, such as palopa, should be adopted and adapted. For the Sambian people, the phrase kwolu-aatmwol describes a third gender identity. Terminology is also borrowed from other Pacific communities, for example the term 'sister-girl' from Torres Strait Islanders.

Etymology 
The phrase comes from Tok Pisin. It is reportedly a contraction of the name of the singer Jennifer Lopez.

References 

Gender in Oceania
Gender systems
Third gender
Papua New Guinean culture
Transgender in Oceania
Indigenous LGBT culture
Society of Papua New Guinea
LGBT in Papua New Guinea